Stirton is a surname. Notable people with the surname include:

 Brent Stirton, photographer
 David Stirton, Canadian politician
 James Stirton (1833–1917), Scottish botanist and physician
 Robert Stirton Thornton (1863–1936), politician
 Ruben Arthur Stirton (1901–1966), paleontologist

See also 
 Stirton Smith (1926–2010), Scottish footballer
 Stirton with Thorlby
 Stirton's Deer Mouse
 Stirton, Ontario